is an amateur Japanese Greco-Roman wrestler, who played for the men's light heavyweight category. He won a gold and a bronze medal for his division at the 2002 Asian Games in Busan, South Korea, and at the 2006 Asian Games in Doha, Qatar.

Matsumoto made his official debut for the 2004 Summer Olympics in Athens, where he placed second in the preliminary pool of the men's 84 kg class, against Sweden's Ara Abrahamian, Slovakia's Attila Bátky, and Kyrgyzstan's Janarbek Kenjeev.

At the 2008 Summer Olympics in Beijing, Matsumoto competed for the second time in the men's 84 kg class, by receiving a qualifying place from the Asian Wrestling Championships in Jeju City, South Korea. He lost the qualifying round match to Armenia's Denis Forov, with a two-set technical score (2–4, 0–6), and a classification point score of 1–3.

References

External links
NBC 2008 Olympics profile
 

1978 births
Living people
People from Uwajima, Ehime
Olympic wrestlers of Japan
Wrestlers at the 2004 Summer Olympics
Wrestlers at the 2008 Summer Olympics
Sportspeople from Ehime Prefecture
Asian Games medalists in wrestling
Wrestlers at the 2002 Asian Games
Wrestlers at the 2006 Asian Games
Japanese male sport wrestlers
Asian Games gold medalists for Japan
Asian Games bronze medalists for Japan
Medalists at the 2002 Asian Games
Medalists at the 2006 Asian Games
20th-century Japanese people
21st-century Japanese people
Asian Wrestling Championships medalists